Weak Hero Class 1 is a 2022 South Korean television series starring Park Ji-hoon, Choi Hyun-wook, and Hong Kyung. It is based on the popular Naver webtoon Weak Hero written by Seopass and illustrated by Kim Jin-seok (Razen), which was published in 2018, and is a prequel to the events of the series. The first three episodes premiered at the 27th Busan International Film Festival, which was held from October 5 to October 14, 2022. The entire eight-episode series premiered on Wavve on November 18, 2022, and was simultaneously broadcast overseas on Kocowa, Viki, and IQIYI.

Synopsis
Yeon Si-eun (Park Ji-hoon) is among the top 1% of students in his class and is not interested in anything except studying. Though he is physically weak, he does not back down from the bullies in his classroom led by Jeon Yeong-bin (Kim Su-gyeom). Using his quick decision-making skills, his knowledge of physics, and the objects in his surroundings, Si-eun protects himself from their escalating acts of violence. But when he gets in grave danger, he receives help from Ahn Su-ho (Choi Hyun-wook), the strongest fighter in their class, and Oh Beom-seok (Hong Kyung), the tormented son of an assemblyman. The three become friends as they try to survive a high school life full of violence and learn what it truly means to be strong.

Cast

Main
Park Ji-hoon as Yeon Si-eun
Jang Jae-ha as young Yeon Si-eun
 A model student in the top 1% of his class and a voluntary outsider who is only interested in his studies. He is physically weak so he protects himself with his quick analytical skills, knowledge of physics, and awareness of his surroundings. He has a pretty face but carries a lethargic expression. He is meticulous and usually quiet but is straightforward and curt in his speech, which can rub some the wrong way. When the lead bully in his classroom targets him out of jealousy, he does not back down and becomes entangled in a web of escalating violence. He gets unexpected help from Su-ho and Beom-seok, who become his allies and best friends.
Choi Hyun-wook as Ahn Su-ho
 A free spirit who is the strongest fighter in his class. He does not care much for school and only comes in every day because of a promise he made to his grandmother that he'd graduate with perfect attendance. Because he works as a delivery driver for his family's restaurant at night, he often sleeps in class. He was once training to become an MMA fighter. He is loyal and kind but has a quick temperament, often using his strength and fighting skills to solve disagreements. After Beom-seok convinces him to help Si-eun, the three boys become good friends.
Hong Kyung as Oh Beom-seok
 A feeble and timid boy who wishes to become strong like the people around him. He was tormented relentlessly by bullies at his former school, forcing him to transfer. He is the adopted son of a wealthy assemblyman but experiences a tumultuous home life due to his father's physical and emotional abuse. When he gets intimidated by Yeong-bin into helping him bully Si-eun, he later wants to help Si-eun out of guilt and convinces Su-ho to come along. Though the three become friends and allies, Bum-seok's inferiority complex threatens to tear them apart.

Supporting
Lee Yeon as Yeong-i
 A courageous runaway who got involved with a dangerous gang of delinquents. She is bold and not shy around men, sometimes even joking about dating Si-eun. After her gang is dissolved, she stays with Su-ho for a while and starts working part-time at a restaurant. As she becomes closer friends with Si-eun and Su-ho, she becomes the target of Beom-seok's spiraling emotions.
Shin Seung-ho as Jeon Seok-dae
 The leader of a group of delinquents, who gets involved with Si-eun and his friends when his cousin Yeong-bin asks for his help with taking revenge on Si-eun. He appears indifferent but actually cares deeply for his friends, especially Yeong-i and the youngest member of the gang, Sung-chan.
Kim Su-gyeom as Jeon Yeong-bin
 A sadistic bully who targets Si-eun after he comes in second after him in a math competition. When Si-eun seems unfazed by his continuous threats, he resorts to increasingly more reckless and dangerous methods of bullying. After losing his first fight against Si-eun, he involves his cousin Seok-dae, a gang member, in their dispute and triggers a domino effect of escalating violence.
Cha Woo-min as Kang Woo-young
 A young MMA fighter who holds a grudge against Su-ho after losing a match against him in middle school.
Na Cheol as Kim Gil-soo
 The ruthless head of a group of delinquent runaways that coerces money out of teenagers through a rigged gambling app.
Gong Hyun-joo as Si-eun's mother
 A math lecturer that rarely spends time with her son due to her busy schedule. Si-eun often falls asleep to her online lectures.
Kim Sung-kyun as Gyu-jin
 Si-eun's father and a national judo coach. Like Si-eun's mother, he barely spends time with his son due to his work and constant business trips and is unaware of what his son is doing.
Jo Han-chul as Oh Jin-won, Beom-seok's adoptive father. A wealthy but cruel and prideful assemblyman. 
Yeon Jeong-hoon as Lee Jeong-chan, one of Yeong-bin's henchmen
Hwang Seong-bin as Han Tae-hoon, one of Yeong-bin's henchmen
Yeon Ji-young as their homeroom teacher
Shin Jun-chul as a Korean literature teacher
Kim Hyun as the principal of Byeoksan High School
Oh Dong-min as Assistant Park, Oh Jin-won's aide
Jo Young-geun as Oh Jin-won's secretary
Lee Jae-hak as a gang member
Gong Jun-ho as a student who gets embroiled with Kim Gil-soo

Special appearances
Cha Sung-je as Sung-chan, a boy Jeon Seok-dae sees as his little brother
Jo Ah-young as Jeon Yeong-bin's friend (Ep. 1)
Jang Dae-woong as Kim Won-seok (Ep. 2–3)
Kang Jun-young as a police officer (Ep. 3)
Kim Tae-joon as a police officer (Ep. 4)
Byun Jung-hee as Ahn Su-ho's grandmother (Ep. 8)
Yoo Su-bin as Choi Hyo-man, the leader of the first-year class 3 at Eun-jang High School and the head of the delinquent students (Ep. 8)

Episodes

Production

Development
It was announced by Jaedam Media in May 2021 that they had reached an agreement with Playlist to co-produce a drama adaptation of the popular Naver webtoon, Weak Hero. It was later confirmed that shotcake, the studio co-founded by director and screenwriter Han Jun-hee (Netflix's D.P.), would also be producing the drama. Yu Su-min, who had recently won Best Film at the Mise-en-scène Short Film Festival, would direct and write the series while Han would serve as creative director. For the action choreography and stunts, martial arts director Heo Myeong-haeng (Vincenzo) would direct and Ahn Ji-Hye (Squid Game) would serve as art director. The original soundtrack would be produced by Primary.

To create the gloomy and cold atmosphere the titular character is known for, Park Ji-hoon revealed that he took inspiration from Won Bin's performance in The Man from Nowhere (2010) as well as Kwon Sang-woo in Once Upon a Time in High School (2004). The climax at the end of Episode 8 is a direct homage to the final scene in the latter. He also lost over 10 pounds of muscle to achieve Si-eun's weak appearance. The cast also attended action school together for several months so they could safely film the intense action sequences.

Casting
In an interview to the press on November 30th, 2022, Director Han Jun-hee went into depth about the casting process for Weak Hero: Class One. Han had previously stated that they wanted to "invite actors who have great energy and could lead the next generation of Korean dramas and film." He said Park Ji-hoon, Choi Hyun-wook, Hong Kyung, Shin Seung-ho, and Lee Yeon are all new actors who have been working a long time in film, dramas, and on stage. He believes Weak Hero to be an opportunity to introduce these actors (to a wider audience) and serve as a beginning as they go on to stand out in many works in the future. On the casting of Park Ji-hoon in the lead, Han revealed that the idol actor was originally suggested by shotcake CEO and co-founder Lee Myung-jin. Lee was amazed with Park's performance in At a Distance, Spring Is Green (2021) and Han found it amazing as well when he viewed it. After reviewing more of Park's work and interviews, he was convinced he could show various faces and wanted to see if one could be that of a universal student in his late teens. He believed director Yu felt something similar when the suggestion was brought to him. Han went on to further praise Park as "the only actor in his 20's that could create such an atmosphere" and commended his great attitude and consideration for the staff on set. On Choi Hyun-wook's casting, Han said that he first saw him in Taxi Driver (2021) and was curious about him, but it was his appearance in Racket Boys (2021) that made him call right away as he believed that Choi would become a difficult actor to get a hold of. Overall, Han stated, it was intuition and he found it fortunate that this cast was able to take the drama.

Promotion
On September 22, the official trailer video of Weak Hero Class 1 was released on the official website of the Busan International Film Festival, YouTube channel, and Wave YouTube channel, while the second trailer and poster were released on November 7. As the official sponsor for 27th Busan International Film Festival, Wavve installed several brand booth including a photo zone for Weak Hero Class 1 at the Haeundae Beach. On the premier day of 27th BIFF, director Yoo Soo-min, creative director Han Jun-hee, and actors Park Ji-hoon, Choi Hyun-wook, Hong Kyung, Shin Seung-ho, and Lee Yeon attended the festival's open talk event held at the Busan Cinema Center in Haeundae-gu.

The press conference and production presentation for the drama was held on November 16, 2022, at CGV Yongsan I-Park Mall in Seoul.

Wavve held the largest ticket discount event to mark the opening of its original drama Weak Hero Class 1.
Wavve sells annual tickets at a 41% discount for 13 days from 10:00 (KST) on the day of its released. This marks the first time that a 12-month pass for all premium, standard, and basic products is offered at a discounted price.

A choreography video for the second title track, "Brass Knuckle", was released on December 15, 2022, by Prime Kingz, a world-class crump dance team.

Release
In February 2022, Wavve unveiled their thirty contents lineup for 2022, including Weak Hero which was scheduled to release in the second half of 2022.

The series premiered at 27th Busan International Film Festival in the "Onscreen Section" on October 7, 2022, where three episodes out of eight were shown as a world premiere and then screened on October 8 and 11, and will be exclusively released all episodes in November. The tickets to the world premiere on October 7 were sold out in two minutes.

It was released exclusively on Wavve at 11:00 (KST) on November 18, 2022, with a viewing rating of 18+. The drama was simultaneously aired on Viki United States, iQIYI USA and Taiwan, Kocowa United States, Amazon Prime, Comcast, Google TV, and The Roku Channel. In December 2022, Viki, a platform specializing in Asian content, has additionally confirmed airing in Europe, Oceania, the Middle East, and India following the released in the United States.

Original soundtrack

The following is the official track list of Weak Hero Class 1 Original Soundtrack album. The tracks with no indicated lyricists and composers are the drama's musical score; the artists indicated for these tracks are the tracks' composers themselves. The album consisting of a total of 5 tracks, including the two singles "Hero (Prod. by Primary)" by Meego  and "Brass Knuckle" by Boi. B.

Reception
Following the success of the drama, the cast and crew went on a five-day reward vacation to Nha Trang, Vietnam.

Viewership
Weak Hero'''s popularity was driven primarily through word of mouth and positive comments on social media and communities. The drama became an overnight hit, immediately becoming Wavve's number one drama in paid subscribers within the first day, garnering a 9.9 rating overseas through iQIYI, Kocowa, and Viki, and glowing reviews from critics. According to the data compiled by Good Data Corporation, it ranked first in the 'OTT Topic' drama/series category for four consecutive weeks. According to Wavve, Weak Hero was the first OTT series to rank in the top 3 for viewing time and remained in the top 10 ranking on iQiyi Taiwan and North America." It also ranked second in the rankings for the 3rd week of November 19-25, compiled by OTT integrated search site Kinolights.

Critical response
After being screened from episode 1 to episode 3 as an invitational film at the 27th Busan International Film Festival "On Screen", it has been evaluated as a perfect well-made drama with the story, directing, acting, and music and is considered one of the most anticipated drama in the second half of the year. At Letterboxd, 107 viewers give the series a composite score of 4.5 of 5 stars, and scored 9.7 points on Viki.YTN's Kim Seong-hyun consider "the most eye-catching work among numerous contents this year", praising the drama for its "appropriate balance of power between the characters shown by the three actors and the different charms they add to the densely packed story and the unpredictable development", with high-intensity action, which is "overflowing with a sense of impact and yet in touch with reality", and "Primary music filled with lyrical yet sensuous melodies". Sudarshana Ganguly of The Telegraph, an Indian English daily newspaper named the drama as "2022 Best K-drama". She then gave the drama a rating of 4.5/5 stars and said that the drama "stands out with its striking realism. It does not show a redeeming avenger but rather, flawed characters who often get caught up in the very cycle they are trying to break." She continue and praised Park Ji-hoon for his "nuanced acting, down to his expressions, [and the] delivery of subtle emotions", and Choi Hyun-wook's "charismatic character that stands out on his own". Writing for Forbes,  Joan MacDonald opined that the drama "offers plenty of surprises and interesting character development. Intense, fast-paced and well-acted, a look at how devastating bullying can be." Kim Soo-hyun of The Chosun Ilbo wrote in the article the interesting points of the series are the realistic story of Sieun, Sooho, and Beomseok, fresh and original action movements that have never been seen anywhere else, three lead actors (Park Ji-hoon, Choi Hyun-wook, and Hong Kyung) who have established themselves as 'trustworthy actors' among the Rising Star, and the remarkable directing between two directors. Kim concluded by saying that Weak Hero is "the best well-made work in the second half of 2022, with the story, directing, acting, and action." Park Jin-young of JoyNews24'' wrote that the series "enhances the sense of reality by containing the worries that everyone has experienced at least once in their adolescence, such as the bond with friends, a sense of belonging somewhere, and the desire to take a step forward for a better future." Gong Hee-jeong, a drama critic, said, "Although the action scenes are stimulating and horrifying, the point that makes us think about the faults of adults beyond children's violence by sufficiently capturing the position and inner feelings of each character stands out." A culture critic, Jung Deok-hyeon, analyzed, "At the point when you think about what kind of conflict there will be a new sense of immersion is formed as problems within the children's relationship erupt." Several Korean medias dubbed Choi Hyun-wook's character Ahn Su-ho as the "Fighter of Loyalty".

References

External links
 Official Webtoon
 Official fandom community
 
 

2022 web series debuts
2022 South Korean television series debuts
2020s teen drama television series
Korean-language television shows
South Korean teen dramas
South Korean drama web series
South Korean action television series
South Korean high school television series
Television series about bullying
Television series about teenagers
Television shows based on South Korean webtoons
Wavve original programming